Subramaniam Siva is an Indian film director and actor who works in the Tamil film industry.

Early life 
Subramaniam Siva was born in Tamil Nadu. Before becoming a director, he was an assistant to director V. Z. Durai.

Career

Directing
Subramaniam Siva made his debut with the romantic comedy Thiruda Thirudi in 2003, featuring Dhanush and Chaya Singh. The success of the film meant that he later remade it in Telugu as Donga Dongadi (2004) with a new cast. He subsequently went on to make Pori (2007) featuring Jiiva, and then took the opportunity of directing Ameer in Yogi (2009), his debut film as an actor, which took two years to make.

His fifth directorial movie was Seedan (2011), a remake of the 2002 Malayalam film Nandanam, and the film featured Unni Mukundan and Ananya in the lead roles, while Dhanush made a guest appearance. He went on to help with the post-production of Velaiilla Pattadhari (2014) and also went on to write dialogues for Amma Kanakku (2016).

He made his comeback to directing with the 2021 film Vellai Yaanai, a film starring Samuthirakani, Athmiya Rajan, and Yogi Babu. The film released live on Sun TV.

Acting
Subramaniam Siva started his acting career with the 2018 film Vada Chennai and later acted in the 2019 film Asuran. Both films were directed by Vetrimaaran and starred Dhanush in the lead role. In 2021, he played a supporting role in the crime film Writer.

Filmography

Director

Actor

References

Living people
Tamil-language film directors
Film directors from Tamil Nadu
21st-century Indian film directors
Telugu film directors
Year of birth missing (living people)